Robin Daniel Skinner (born 15 December 1998), known professionally as Cavetown (sometimes stylized in all lowercase), is an English singer-songwriter, record producer, and YouTuber. His style blends elements of indie rock, indie pop and bedroom pop with mellow, gentle ukulele ballads.

As of June 2022, he had amassed over 8.1 million monthly streamers on Spotify. His YouTube channel, which he began in November 2012, sits at 2.09 million subscribers and 398 million video views as of June 2022. Skinner released his fourth studio album, Sleepyhead, in March 2020 and his fifth, Worm Food, in November 2022.

Early life 
Skinner was born in Oxford, England, on 15 December 1998. His interest in music was inspired by his father, David Skinner, a musicologist and choir director, who taught him how to play the acoustic guitar at the age of eight. His mother is a professional Baroque flautist and music teacher. He was raised in Cambridge and attended Parkside Community College from 2010 to 2015 and Hills Road Sixth Form College until 2017.

Career

2012–2015: YouTube and Bandcamp 
Skinner began his YouTube channel in November 2012 and uploaded his first video, an original song named "Haunted Lullaby", in October 2013. The first song Skinner wrote and recorded was "Rain" in 2013. Soon after, Skinner began releasing music to Bandcamp with his first album, Everything Is Made of Clouds, at the age of 14. He released Gd Vibes, Nervous Friends // Pt. 1, Balance (as brother) and Everything is Made of Stars on Bandcamp over the following two years. Critics expressed that he felt "the acceptance of ignorance" on Gd Vibes. Skinner released his debut single "This is Home" in August 2015, before releasing his debut self-titled album in November 2015. Critics described the album Cavetown as "an eclectic mix of acoustic and electronic". Skinner continued to publish covers of songs onto his YouTube channel from artists such as Pinegrove, Twenty One Pilots and Joji.

2016–2018: 16/04/16 and Lemon Boy 

In 2016, Skinner released his second studio album, 16/04/16. The album includes a mix of "warm, melodic bedroom pop" and "lo-fi indie rock". The album was dedicated to his childhood friend, Jack Graham, who died of leukaemia on the album's titular date. 60% of the album's proceeds were donated to Cancer Research UK.

In April 2017, whilst still at Sixth Form College, Skinner reached the final of the Cambridge Band Competition, winning both Best Acoustic Act and the Kimberley Rew Award for Songwriting, and went on to play at Strawberry Fair in June 2017. In 2018, he released his third album, Lemon Boy. , the album's title track has amassed 54 million streams on Spotify and 28 million views on YouTube.

2019–2021: Animal Kingdom, Sleepyhead and Man's Best Friend

In 2019, Skinner released five split singles which were later compiled into Animal Kingdom, a mixtape of ten tracks including covers and original singles with guest appearances from Sidney Gish, Simi, Chloe Moriondo and Spookyghostboy. He produced the single "Prom Dress" by Mxmtoon, which has gained over 152 million streams on Spotify and has been used in over 100,000 videos on the video-sharing platform TikTok. The single was featured on Mxmtoon's debut album The Masquerade, which was also fully produced by Skinner. Skinner performed on the Acoustic Stage at Victorious Festival in August 2019. He signed under Sire Records in 2019 where he released the single "Telescope" ahead of his upcoming album, later announced as Sleepyhead. Skinner embarked on a series of sold-out worldwide headlining tours in October 2019. He played on tour at 31 venues in the US and 15 venues in the UK over the space of four months. He was joined by Hunny and Mxmtoon for a few shows in the UK tour, as well as Field Medic and Chloe Moriondo for a few shows in the US tour. In October 2019, Skinner announced his headlining tour along Australia's east coast, which took place in January 2020, where he was accompanied by Spookyghostboy.

In 2020, Skinner released his major label debut album Sleepyhead, and appeared on the Recording Academy's Sessions series in support of MusiCares. He cancelled the tour in support of Sleepyhead due to the COVID-19 pandemic in June 2020. In July 2020, Skinner collaborated with Tessa Violet on the single "Smoke Signals" and announced the launch of his unisex clothing line Cave Collective.

In June 2021, he released his extended play Man's Best Friend.

2022–present: Worm Food 
In 2022, Skinner released several singles, three of which were part of the album Worm Food, released 4 November. Worm Food includes 13 tracks, featuring guests such as Pierce the Veil, Beebadoobee, and Chloe Moriondo

Personal life
Skinner has stated that he is on both the aromantic and asexual spectrums. He came out as transgender in September 2020. His pronouns are he/they. Skinner lives in Cambridge as of 2019. He has attention deficit hyperactivity disorder.

Discography

Studio albums

Extended plays

Mixtapes

Singles

As lead artist

As featured artist

Other certified songs

Bandcamp releases
as Cavetown
Everything Is Made of Clouds (2013)
Gd Vibes (2014)
Covers (2015)
Youtube covers (2015)
Nervous Friends // Pt. 1 (2015)
Everything Is Made of Stars (2015)
as brother
balance (2015)
not anywhere (alex g cover) (2018)
bny rabit (2018)
i want to meet your dog (2018)
Hate (2019)

Notes

References

External links
 
 
 Official website
 Cavetown on Twitter

Living people
1998 births
Aromantic men
Asexual men
Bedroom pop musicians
British indie pop musicians
British indie rock musicians
British Internet celebrities
English male singer-songwriters
English YouTubers
Music YouTubers
People from Oxford
People with attention deficit hyperactivity disorder
Sire Records artists
Transgender male musicians
Warner Records artists
YouTube vloggers
English LGBT singers
English LGBT songwriters
English transgender people
21st-century English male singers
21st-century English LGBT people
Transgender singers
Transgender songwriters
Ballad musicians